The Cathedral of Battambang, or Cathedral of Our Lady of the Assumption, was a former Roman Catholic cathedral in Battambang, Cambodia. It was built during the French colonial government in Cambodia and was destroyed in 1975 by the Khmer Rouge.

See also
List of cathedrals in Cambodia
Khmer Rouge rule of Cambodia

References

Buildings and structures demolished in 1975
Cathedrals in Cambodia
Destroyed churches
Roman Catholic cathedrals in Cambodia